Merve Kenger (born 10 October 1993) is a Turkish freestyle wrestler. She represented Turkey at the 2015 European Games held in Baku, Azerbaijan and she won one of the bronze medals in the 53 kg event.

In 2014, she competed in the women's freestyle 53 kg event at the World Wrestling Championships held in Tashkent, Uzbekistan. She also competed in the women's freestyle 53 kg event at the 2015 World Wrestling Championships held in Las Vegas, United States.

Major results

References

External links 
 

Living people
1993 births
Place of birth missing (living people)
Turkish female sport wrestlers
European Games medalists in wrestling
European Games bronze medalists for Turkey
Wrestlers at the 2015 European Games
21st-century Turkish sportswomen